The 2019 Dallas Baptist Patriots baseball team represented Dallas Baptist University during the 2019 NCAA Division I baseball season. The Patriots played their home games at Horner Ballpark as a member of the Missouri Valley Conference. They were led by head coach Dan Heefner, in his 12th season at Dallas Baptist.

Previous season
The 2018 Dallas Baptist Patriots baseball team notched a 36–17 (16–5) regular season record and finished second in the Missouri Valley Conference standings. The Patriots reached the finals of the 2018 Missouri Valley Conference baseball tournament, where they were defeated by Missouri State in 10 innings. Dallas Baptist received an at-large bid to the 2019 NCAA Division I baseball tournament. The Patriots were eliminated from the NCAA tournament by Arkansas in the Fayetteville Regional.

Personnel

Coaching staff

Roster

Schedule and results

! style="background:#001740;color:white;"| Regular Season (38–16)
|- valign="top" 

|- align="center" bgcolor="bbffbb"
| February 15 || 6:30 pm ||  || * ||  || Horner Ballpark • Dallas, TX || W3–0 || Martinson(1–0) || Wollersheim(0–1) || Bayless(1) || 1,044 || 1–0 || – || StatsStory
|- align="center" bgcolor="bbffbb"
| February 16 || 2:00 pm ||  || Kent State* ||  || Horner Ballpark • Dallas, TX || W8–4 || Towns(1–0) || Matthews(0–1) || – || 542 || 2–0 || – || StatsStory
|- align="center" bgcolor="bbffbb"
| February 17 || 12:00 pm ||  || Kent State* ||  || Horner Ballpark • Dallas, TX || W8–1 || Johnson(1–0) || Schreiber(0–1) || – || 482 || 3–0 || – || StatsStory
|- align="center" bgcolor="ffbbbb"
| February 20 || 3:00 pm ||  || at * ||  || L. Dale Mitchell Baseball Park • Norman, OK || L2–4 || Abram(1–0) || Towns(1–1) || Matthews(1) || 409 || 3–1 || – || StatsStory
|- align="center" bgcolor="bbffbb"
| February 22 || 6:30 pm ||  || * ||  || Horner Ballpark • Dallas, TX || W9–0 || Martinson(2–0) || Lackney(0–1) || – || 496 || 4–1 || – || StatsStory
|- align="center" bgcolor="ffbbbb"
| February 23 || 2:00 pm ||  || Minnesota* ||  || Horner Ballpark • Dallas, TX || L7–9 || Fredrickson(1–1) || Eldred(0–1) || Meyer(2) || 742 || 4–2 || – || StatsStory
|- align="center" bgcolor="bbffbb"
| February 24 || 1:00 pm ||  || Minnesota* ||  || Horner Ballpark • Dallas, TX || W7–5 || Johnson(2–0) || Thoresen(0–2) || – || 401 || 5–2 || – || StatsStory
|- align="center" bgcolor="ffbbbb"
| February 26 || 6:35 pm ||  || at #14 * ||  || Baylor Ballpark • Waco, TX || L4–10 || Leckich(2–0) || Kechely(0–1) || – || 1,388 || 5–3 || – || StatsStory
|-

|- align="center" bgcolor="bbffbb"
| March 1 || 3:00 pm ||  || * ||  || Horner Ballpark • Dallas, TX || W7–1 || Martinson(3–0) || Carter(1–1) || Kechely(1) || 220 || 6–3 || – || StatsStory
|- align="center" bgcolor="bbffbb"
| March 1 || 6:00 pm ||  || Houston Baptist* ||  || Horner Ballpark • Dallas, TX || W2–1 || Bayless(1–0) || Newton(0–1) || – || 402 || 7–3 || – || StatsStory
|- align="center" bgcolor="bbffbb"
| March 2 || 1:00 pm ||  || Houston Baptist* ||  || Horner Ballpark • Dallas, TX || W12–2 || Johnson(3–0) || Batten(0–1) || – || 447 || 8–3 || – || StatsStory
|- align="center" bgcolor="bbffbb"
| March 6 || 3:00 pm ||  || #25 Oklahoma* ||  || Horner Ballpark • Dallas, TX || W7–2 || Carraway(1–0) || Matthews(0–1) || – || 569 || 9–3 || – || StatsStory
|- align="center" bgcolor="bbffbb"
| March 8 || 6:00 pm ||  || at * ||  || J. L. Johnson Stadium • Tulsa, OK || W13–8 || Martinson(4–0) || McMinn(2–2) || – || 943 || 10–3 || – || StatsStory
|- align="center" bgcolor="bbffbb"
| March 9 || 2:00 pm ||  || at Oral Roberts* ||  || J. L. Johnson Stadium • Tulsa, OK || W13–6 || Carraway(2–0) || Gaskins(1–1) || – || 984 || 11–3 || – || StatsStory
|- align="center" bgcolor="bbffbb"
| March 10 || 1:00 pm ||  || at Oral Roberts* ||  || J. L. Johnson Stadium • Tulsa, OK || W6–2 || Bayless(2–0) || Wolf(0–1) || – || 742 || 12–3 || – || StatsStory
|- align="center" bgcolor="bbffbb"
| March 12 || 6:30 pm ||  || #21 Texas A&M* ||  || Horner Ballpark • Dallas, TX || W5–4 || Hines(1–0) || Jozwiak(2–1) || Carraway(1) || 2,047 || 13–3 || – || StatsStory
|- align="center" bgcolor="ffbbbb"
| March 15 || 6:30 pm ||  || * ||  || Horner Ballpark • Dallas, TX || L6–8 || Henry(1–0) || Hines(1–1) || Roedahl(2) || 871 || 13–4 || – || StatsStory
|- align="center" bgcolor="ffbbbb"
| March 16 || 2:00 pm ||  || Houston* ||  || Horner Ballpark • Dallas, TX || L0–2 || Villarreal(2–0) || Johnson(3–1) || – || 893 || 13–5 || – || StatsStory
|- align="center" bgcolor="bbffbb"
| March 17 || 1:00 pm ||  || Houston* ||  || Horner Ballpark • Dallas, TX || W8–4 || Bayless(3–0) || Roedahl(3–1) || – || 794 || 14–5 || – || StatsStory
|- align="center" bgcolor="bbffbb"
| March 19 || 6:30 pm ||  || * ||  || Horner Ballpark • Dallas, TX || W7–5 || Carraway(3–0) || Battenfield(3–2) || Hines(1) || 962 || 15–5 || – || StatsStory
|- align="center" bgcolor="bbffbb"
| March 22 || 4:00 pm ||  || at * ||  || Falcon Baseball Field • Colorado Springs, CO || W4–312 || Hines(2–1) || Price(3–1) || Kechely(2) || 66 || 16–5 || – || StatsStory
|- align="center" bgcolor="bbffbb"
| March 23 || 2:00 pm ||  || at Air Force* ||  || Falcon Baseball Field • Colorado Springs, CO || W6–5 || Bayless(4–0) || Chilcutt(0–2) || Kechely(3) || 117 || 17–5 || – || StatsStory
|- align="center" bgcolor="bbffbb"
| March 24 || 1:00 pm ||  || at Air Force* ||  || Falcon Baseball Field • Colorado Springs, CO || W30–7 || Fouse(1–0) || Nichols(1–2) || – || 127 || 18–5 || – || StatsStory
|- align="center" bgcolor="ffbbbb"
| March 26 || 6:30 pm ||  || UT Arlington* ||  || Horner Ballpark • Dallas, TX || L0–9 || Gooch(1–2) || Kechely(0–2) || – || 837 || 18–6 || – || StatsStory
|- align="center" bgcolor="bbffbb"
| March 29 || 6:30 pm ||  ||  ||  || Horner Ballpark • Dallas, TX || W10–5 || Martinson(5–0) || Tieman(1–4) || – || 831 || 19–6 || 1–0 || StatsStory
|- align="center" bgcolor="bbffbb"
| March 30 || 2:00 pm ||  || Valparaiso ||  || Horner Ballpark • Dallas, TX || W10–5 || Johnson(4–1) || Fields(2–2) || – || 552 || 20–6 || 2–0 || StatsStory
|- align="center" bgcolor="bbffbb"
| March 31 || 1:00 pm ||  || Valparaiso ||  || Horner Ballpark • Dallas, TX || W6–1 || Fouse(2–0) || Fricke(0–2) || – || 493 || 21–6 || 3–0 || StatsStory
|-

|- align="center" bgcolor="ffbbbb"
| April 2 || 6:30 pm ||  || #22 Baylor* ||  || Horner Ballpark • Dallas, TX || L1–5 || Helmer(1–0) || Kechely(0–3) || – || 1,694 || 21–7 || – || StatsStory
|- align="center" bgcolor="ffbbbb"
| April 5 || 6:00 pm ||  || at  ||  || Charles H. Braun Stadium • Evansville, IN || L3–8 || Lukas(4–2) || Carraway(3–1) || Parks(4) || 237 || 21–8 || 3–1 || StatsStory
|- align="center" bgcolor="ffbbbb"
| April 6 || 1:00 pm ||  || at Evansville ||  || Charles H. Braun Stadium • Evansville, IN || L5–11 || Gray(2–0) || Bayless(4–1) || – || 232 || 21–9 || 3–2 || StatsStory
|- align="center" bgcolor="bbffbb"
| April 6 || 5:00 pm ||  || at Evansville ||  || Charles H. Braun Stadium • Evansville, IN || W4–3 || Heaton(1–0) || Weigand(2–3) || Hines(2) || 232 || 22–9 || 4–2 || StatsStory
|- align="center" bgcolor="bbffbb"
| April 9 || 6:30 pm ||  || #22 TCU* ||  || Horner Ballpark • Dallas, TX || W11–6 || Reeves(1–0) || Green(2–1) || – || 1,542 || 23–9 || – || StatsStory
|- align="center" bgcolor="ffbbbb"
| April 12 || 5:00 pm ||  || at * ||  || CofC Baseball Stadium • Charleston, SC || L3–4 || McLarty(6–2) || Martinson(5–1) || Ocker(8) || 556 || 23–10 || – || StatsStory
|- align="center" bgcolor="bbffbb"
| April 13 || 1:00 pm ||  || at College of Charleston* ||  || CofC Baseball Stadium • Charleston, SC || W6–2 || Johnson(5–1) || Lucas(3–1) || Carraway(2) || 603 || 24–10 || – || StatsStory
|- align="center" bgcolor="bbffbb"
| April 14 || 11:30 am ||  || at College of Charleston* ||  || CofC Baseball Stadium • Charleston, SC || W14–4 || Bayless(5–1) || Price(5–3) || – || 518 || 25–10 || – || StatsStory
|- align="center" bgcolor="ffbbbb"
| April 16 || 6:05 pm ||  || at Oklahoma State* ||  || Allie P. Reynolds Stadium • Stillwater, OK || L3–6 || Kelly(1–0) || Kechely(0–4) || Gragg(2) || 1,511 || 25–11 || – || StatsStory
|- align="center" bgcolor="ffbbbb"
| April 19 || 4:00 pm ||  ||  ||  || Horner Ballpark • Dallas, TX || L1–2 || Olson(1–0) || Martinson(5–2) || Denlinger(3) || 476 || 25–12 || 4–3 || StatsStory
|- align="center" bgcolor="bbffbb"
| April 20 || 2:00 pm ||  || Bradley ||  || Horner Ballpark • Dallas, TX || W14–3 || Johnson(6–1) || Gosswein(4–3) || – || 801 || 26–12 || 5–3 || StatsStory
|- align="center" bgcolor="bbffbb"
| April 20 || 5:50 pm ||  || Bradley ||  || Horner Ballpark • Dallas, TX || W7–6 || Hines(3–1) || Cook(4–1) || – || 801 || 27–12 || 6–3 || StatsStory
|- align="center" bgcolor="bbffbb"
| April 23 || 3:00 pm ||  || at TCU* ||  || Lupton Stadium • Fort Worth, TX || W9–3 || Stone(1–0) || Eissler(3–4) || – || 3,936 || 28–12 || – || StatsStory
|- align="center" bgcolor="ffbbbb"
| April 26 || 6:30 pm ||  || Illinois State ||  || Horner Ballpark • Dallas, TX || L8–9 || Headrick(5–3) || Martinson(5–3) || Gilmore(10) || 1,184 || 28–13 || 6–4 || StatsStory
|- align="center" bgcolor="bbffbb"
| April 27 || 2:00 pm ||  || Illinois State ||  || Horner Ballpark • Dallas, TX || W13–3 || Johnson(7–1) || Lindgren(4–3) || – || 1,000 || 29–13 || 7–4 || StatsStory
|- align="center" bgcolor="bbffbb"
| April 28 || 12:00 pm ||  || Illinois State ||  || Horner Ballpark • Dallas, TX || W11–4 || Bayless(6–1) || Walker(3–6) || – || 648 || 30–13 || 8–4 || StatsStory
|- align="center" bgcolor="bbffbb"
| April 30 || 8:15 pm ||  || at UT Arlington* ||  || Clay Gould Ballpark • Arlington, TX || W7–1 || Fouse(3–0) || Skeffington(0–1) || – || 345 || 31–13 || – || StatsStory
|-

|- align="center" bgcolor="bbffbb"
| May 2 || 6:00 pm || ESPNU || at  ||  || Hammons Field • Springfield, MO || W6–1 || Martinson(6–3) || Lochner(3–2) || – || 273 || 32–13 || 9–4 || StatsStory
|- align="center" bgcolor="ffbbbb"
| May 4 || 12:00 pm ||  || at Missouri State ||  || Hammons Field • Springfield, MO || L3–4 || Wiley(3–5) || Johnson(7–2) || Sechler(4) ||  || 32–14 || 9–5 || StatsStory
|- align="center" bgcolor="ffbbbb"
| May 4 || 3:30 pm ||  || at Missouri State ||  || Hammons Field • Springfield, MO || L0–6 || Schwab(2–4) || Sherlin(0–1) || – || 455 || 32–15 || 9–6 || StatsStory
|- align="center" bgcolor="bbffbb"
| May 7 || 6:30 pm ||  || * ||  || Horner Ballpark • Dallas, TX || W11–0 || Towns(2–1) || Sgambelluri(2–5) || – || 844 || 33–15 || – || StatsStory
|- align="center" bgcolor="bbffbb"
| May 10 || 6:30 pm ||  || Indiana State ||  || Horner Ballpark • Dallas, TX || W12–2 || Martinson(7–3) || Polley(6–1) || – || 828 || 34–15 || 10–6 || StatsStory
|- align="center" bgcolor="bbffbb"
| May 11 || 8:30 pm || ESPNU || Indiana State ||  || Horner Ballpark • Dallas, TX || W8–1 || Johnson(8–2) || Liberatore(9–1) || – || 801 || 35–15 || 11–6 || StatsStory
|- align="center" bgcolor="bbffbb"
| May 12 || 2:00 pm ||  || Indiana State ||  || Horner Ballpark • Dallas, TX || W7–3 || Carraway(4–1) || Whitbread(6–2) || Hines(3) || 686 || 36–15 || 12–6 || StatsStory
|- align="center" bgcolor="ffbbbb"
| May 16 || 6:30 pm ||  || at  || #27 || Itchy Jones Stadium • Carbondale, IL || L2–3 || Yeager(3–2) || Carraway(4–2) || – || 214 || 36–16 || 12–7 || StatsStory
|- align="center" bgcolor="bbffbb"
| May 17 || 6:30 pm ||  || at Southern Illinois || #27 || Itchy Jones Stadium • Carbondale, IL || W11–6 || Johnson(9–2) || Begner(5–7) || – || 297 || 37–16 || 13–7 || StatsStory
|- align="center" bgcolor="bbffbb"
| May 18 || 2:00 pm ||  || at Southern Illinois || #27 || Itchy Jones Stadium • Carbondale, IL || W12–1 || Fouse(4–0) || Steidl(3–3) || – || 255 || 38–16 || 14–7 || StatsStory
|-

|-
! style="background:#001740;color:white;"| Postseason (5–4)
|- valign="top" 

|- align="center" bgcolor="bbffbb"
| May 22 || 11:00 am ||  || (6) Missouri State || (1) || Duffy Bass Field • Normal, IL || W1–0 || Martinson(8–3) || Schwab(3–5) || Carraway(3) ||  || 39–16 || – || StatsStory
|- align="center" bgcolor="bbffbb"
| May 23 || 3:00 pm ||  || (4) Evansville || (1) || Duffy Bass Field • Normal, IL || W9–2 || Bayless(7–1) || Hayden(3–3) || – ||  || 40–16 || – || StatsStory
|- align="center" bgcolor="bbffbb"
| May 24 || 5:00 pm ||  || at (2) Illinois State || (1) || Duffy Bass Field • Normal, IL || W9–7 || Fouse(5–0) || Vogrin(2–1) || Carraway(4) ||  || 41–16 || – || StatsStory
|- align="center" bgcolor="ffbbbb"
| May 25 || 2:00 pm ||  || (3) Indiana State || (1) || Duffy Bass Field • Normal, IL || L5–9 || Moralis(1–0) || Reeves(1–1) || Grauer(8) ||  || 41–17 || – || StatsStory
|- align="center" bgcolor="ffbbbb"
| May 25 || 6:15 pm ||  || (3) Indiana State || (1) || Duffy Bass Field • Normal, IL || L3–168 || Ridgway(2–0) || Towns(2–2) || – || 326 || 41–18 || – || StatsStory
|-

|- align="center" bgcolor="bbffbb"
| May 31 || 7:00 pm ||  || (3) Florida || (2) || Dan Law Field • Lubbock, TX || W11–8 || Johnson(10–2) || Mace(8–5) || Carraway(5) || 4,530 || 42–18 || – || StatsStory
|- align="center" bgcolor="ffbbbb"
| June 1 || 4:36 pm ||  || at (1) Texas Tech || (2) || Dan Law Field • Lubbock, TX || L2–3 || Floyd(5–3) || Martinson(8–4) || – || 4,567 || 42–19 || – || StatsStory
|- align="center" bgcolor="bbffbb"
| June 2 || 2:00 pm ||  || (3) Florida || (2) || Dan Law Field • Lubbock, TX || W9–8 || Fouse(6–0) || Pogue(1–1) || Carraway(6) ||  || 43–19 || – || StatsStory
|- align="center" bgcolor="ffbbbb"
| June 2 || 6:26 pm ||  || at (1) Texas Tech || (2) || Dan Law Field • Lubbock, TX || L0–3 || Bonnin(6–1) || Reeves(1–2) || McMillon(2) || 4,679 || 43–20 || – || StatsStory
|-

| style="font-size:88%"| Legend:       = Win       = Loss      Bold = Dallas Baptist team member
|- 
| style="font-size:88%"|"#" represents ranking. All rankings from Collegiate Baseball on the date of the contest."()" represents postseason seeding in the Missouri Valley Tournament or NCAA Regional, respectively.

Rankings

References

Dallas Baptist Patriots
Dallas Baptist Patriots baseball
Dallas Baptist Patriots baseball seasons
Dallas Baptist